Phillip David Baxter Hoare (born 29 November 1962) is a former English cricketer. Hoare was a right-handed batsman who bowled right-arm medium pace. He was born in Bedford, Bedfordshire.

Hoare made his debut for Bedfordshire against Hertfordshire in the 1985 Minor Counties Championship. He played Minor counties cricket for Bedfordshire from 1985 to 1999, making 106 Minor Counties Championship appearances and 30 MCCA Knockout Trophy appearances. He made his List A debut against Gloucestershire in the 1985 NatWest Trophy. He made 6 further List A appearances, the last of which came against Derbyshire in the 1999 NatWest Trophy. In his 7 List A matches, he scored 52 runs at an average of 10.40, with a high score of 17. With the ball, he took 2 wickets at a bowling average of 32.00, with best figures of 2/64.

His father, David, also played for Bedfordshire.

References

External links

1962 births
Living people
Sportspeople from Bedford
English cricketers
Bedfordshire cricketers